La profezia dell'armadillo is a 2018 Italian comedy-drama film directed by Emanuele Scaringi.

The film is loosely based on the graphic novel of the same name by Zerocalcare. It premiered on 3 September 2018 at the 75th Venice International Film Festival in the "Horizons" section, and was released in Italy on 13 September 2018.

Cast

References

External links

2018 films
2010s Italian-language films
2018 comedy-drama films
Films set in Rome
Italian comedy-drama films
2010s Italian films
Fandango (Italian company) films
Rai Cinema films